I Solisti Veneti is an Italian chamber orchestra founded in Padua in 1959 by Claudio Scimone.

Background 

The ensemble was directed by Scimone until his last concert on 2 September 2018; he died on 6 September. I Solisti Veneti made a reputation especially with Italian Baroque music, recording many works by Antonio Vivaldi, Tomaso Albinoni, Francesco Geminiani, Benedetto Marcello and Giuseppe Tartini. 

I Solisti Veneti has toured the world, playing over 6,000 concerts in over ninety countries, in places as diverse as Salzburg and Seoul. 

As part of its 50th anniversary celebrations in 2008 the European Parliament honoured the Orchestra with an official plaque where they are praised as “Ambassadors of culture and music across the borders”. In April 2018 they gave a concert at the Embassy of Italy, Washington, DC.

Collaborations
The ensemble has recorded with many world-famous artists, including Salvatore Accardo, Plácido Domingo, Jean-Pierre Rampal, Marilyn Horne, James Galway, Mstislav Rostropovich, Sviatoslav Richter, Paul Badura-Skoda, Heinz Holliger and Ugo Orlandi.

Recordings
The group has made over 350 recordings, many on the Erato record label, others on RCA, Sony, Arts, etc. A number of these were first-ever recordings of works of Vivaldi, Albinoni and Rossini. However the repertoire of the orchestra is very wide and extends from 1585 (Giovanni Bassano) up to  many works written  in 2017. More than 70 composers of our times have dedicated works for Claudio Scimone and his Orchestra such as Bussotti, Donatoni, R.Malipiero, L.Chailly, Guaccero, Morricone, Constant, De Pablo, De Marzi, Cadario, Campogrande, Lucio Dalla, Donaggio and many women composers.

I Solisti Veneti has recorded for television and movies. The ensemble has won numerous awards including a Grammy (Los Angeles, 1980), three 'Grand Prix du Disque.' (Académie Charles Cros and Acadèmie du Disque Lyrique). They won the first prize in the original countest of Festivalbar 1970 (juke box recordings) with 350,000 votes of young listeners.

List of members (2017)

Giuliano Carmignola, Piero Toso, Lucio Degani are three soloists who have played in the ensemble. 

The orchestra is drawn from a pool of freelance players, in 2017 regularly featuring the following:

 Conductor: Claudio Scimone
 Principal violin: Lucio Degani
 Violins: Chiara Parrini, Francesco Comisso, Enzo Ligresti, Michelangelo Lentini, Walter Daga, Marco Bronzi
 Violas: Giancarlo Di Vacri, Silvestro Favero, Fabio Merlini
 Violoncello: Gianantonio Viero, Giuseppe Barutti, Ludovico Armellini
 Double bass: Gabriele Ragghianti 
 Flute : Clementine Hoogendoorn
 Oboe : Paolo Grazia, Rossana Calvi, Silvano Scanziani (all principals)
 Clarinet : Lorenzo Guzzoni, Enricomaria Bassan
 Bassoon : Roberto Giaccaglia, Christian Maria Galasso
 Trumpet : Roberto Rigo  
 Hapsichord and Organ : Silvio Celeghin, Fabio Merlini

References

External links
I Solisti Veneti official website
Excerpt of book about I Solisti Veneti, at official website
list of "Edizioni de I Solisti Veneti"
Page for I Solisti Veneti, bbc.co.uk/music/artists with 26 featured tracks

Musical groups established in 1959
Italian orchestras
Early music orchestras
Erato Records artists
1959 establishments in Italy